Koko Ange Mariette Christelle N'Guessan (born 18 November 1990) is an Ivorian professional footballer who plays for Primera División club UDG Tenerife. She was part of the Ivory Coast squad for the 2015 FIFA Women's World Cup.

N'Guessan came to notice by scoring against Norway in a 3–1 defeat at the World Cup. She joined Lithuanian club Gintra Universitetas for the 2015–16 UEFA Women's Champions League qualifying round, then finished the season in Cyprus with Anorthosis Famagusta, scoring 17 goals in 13 league games. She signed for FC Barcelona in August 2016.

See also
List of Ivory Coast women's international footballers

References

External links
 
 Profile at FIF 

1990 births
Living people
Ivorian women's footballers
Ivory Coast women's international footballers
Place of birth missing (living people)
Women's association football forwards
2015 FIFA Women's World Cup players
Gintra Universitetas players
Primera División (women) players
FC Barcelona Femení players
UD Granadilla Tenerife players
Ivorian expatriate women's footballers
Ivorian expatriates in Lithuania
Expatriate women's footballers in Lithuania
Ivorian expatriate sportspeople in Cyprus
Expatriate women's footballers in Cyprus
Ivorian expatriate sportspeople in Spain
Expatriate women's footballers in Spain